Tuerta cyanopasta is a moth of the family Noctuidae. It is found in Kenya.

References

Endemic moths of Kenya
Moths described in 1907
Agaristinae
Moths of Africa